Alma Weaver Byrd (September 18, 1923 – May 3, 2017) was an American politician.

Byrd was born in Aiken, South Carolina. She graduated from Benedict College, Columbia University, and the University of South Carolina. She taught English and French at Benedict College. She served on the Richland County School District One Board and was the vice-chair of the school board. Byrd served as a Democratic member for the 74th district in the South Carolina House of Representatives from 1991 to 1998.

References

1923 births
2017 deaths
People from Aiken, South Carolina
Columbia University alumni
University of South Carolina alumni
Benedict College alumni
Benedict College faculty
Women state legislators in South Carolina
School board members in South Carolina
Democratic Party members of the South Carolina House of Representatives
American women academics
21st-century American women